Kasbi District is a district of Qashqadaryo Region in Uzbekistan. The capital lies at the town Mugʻlon. The district consists of 9 urban-type settlements (Mugʻlon, Denov, Kasbi, Doʻstlik, Yangi qishloq, Xoʻjakasbi, Fazli, Maymanoq, Qatagʻan) and 10 rural communities.

References

Qashqadaryo Region
Districts of Uzbekistan